Ulrike Kleindl (born 27 May 1963) is an Austrian athlete. She competed in the women's long jump at the 1988 Summer Olympics.

References

1963 births
Living people
Athletes (track and field) at the 1988 Summer Olympics
Austrian female long jumpers
Austrian female hurdlers
Olympic athletes of Austria
Sportspeople from Graz